H-class rescue hovercraft serve the shores of the United Kingdom as a part of the RNLI inshore fleet. A modified Type 470TD design built by Griffon Hoverwork, they were developed to operate in tidal areas such as Morecambe Bay, where strandings by incoming tides can have fatal consequences; and in waters too shallow for normal craft.

Hovercraft also operate out of Hunstanton, Hoylake, and Southend-on-Sea stations.

Fleet

References

External links 
RNLI Fleet

Royal National Lifeboat Institution lifeboats
Hovercraft